Irish Street Halt railway station was a suburban halt, one mile south of Armagh station, on the Castleblayney, Keady and Armagh Railway in Northern Ireland.

It operated between 1 January 1913 and 1 February 1932.

Routes

References

Disused railway stations in County Armagh
Railway stations opened in 1913
Railway stations closed in 1932
1913 establishments in Ireland
Railway stations in Northern Ireland opened in the 20th century